Zakaria Khali (born 10 May 1990) is an Algerian footballer who plays for MC Oran in the Algerian Ligue Professionnelle 1 as a defender.

Honours

Club
USM Bel Abbès
 Algerian Cup: 2018

References

External links

1990 births
Living people
Association football defenders
Algerian footballers
USM Bel Abbès players
MC Oran players
21st-century Algerian people